Oasis Airlines  was a charter airline based in Spain.

History
In 1986 a new airline was established in Spain under the name Andalusair and in 1987 the Oasis hotel group took over the airline and since operations were not going well, the renamed the airline Oasis and operations began using MD-83 aircraft on charter flights from the United Kingdom, Scandinavia, and other points in Europe to Spain. Shortly afterwards, the Oasis group bought Aerocancun and the Airbus A310-300 was introduced and used by both Oasis Airlines and Aerocancun. By 1992 more MD-83s and MD-82 were acquired and operations expanded.

During the 1990s the Oasis group invested in other airlines, such as Aerovaradero and Private Jet Expeditions while the charter traffic increased. But by 1995 the demand for tourist flights had decreased and Oasis Airlines entered the scheduled market in Spain. Competition from other airlines was fierce and losses mounted. The financial difficulties led to bankruptcy and the end of operations in late 1996.

Fleet 

17 - McDonnell Douglas MD-82 and 83
5 - Airbus A310-300 Pre- NepalAirlines

References

External links

Fleet and code information
Oasis MD-83 picture

Defunct airlines of Spain
Airlines established in 1986
Airlines disestablished in 1995
1986 establishments in Spain
1995 disestablishments in Spain